Mordellistena acies is a species of beetle in the genus Mordellistena of the family Mordellidae. It was discovered in 1949.

References

acies
Beetles described in 1949